DAA-1097 is a drug which acts as a potent and selective agonist at the peripheral benzodiazepine receptor, also known as the mitochondrial 18 kDa translocator protein or TSPO, but with no affinity at central benzodiazepine receptors. It has anxiolytic effects in animal studies.

References 

Anxiolytics
TSPO ligands
Diphenyl ethers
Acetanilides
Chlorobenzenes